Richard Murray Thomson,  (born August 14, 1933) is a Canadian banker. He earned a Bachelor of Arts and Science degree in engineering from the University of Toronto and a Master of Business Administration from Harvard Business School.

He joined the Toronto-Dominion Bank in 1957 and served in a variety of management positions until succeeding Allen Lambert as president in 1972. He was appointed chairman and  CEO in 1978. He retired as CEO in 1997 and as chairman in 1998.

Thomson has served on the board of directors of the Canada Pension Plan Investment Board, Thomson-Reuters Corporation, Nexen Inc. and S. C. Johnson & Son Canadian Occidental Petroleum, Inco Ltd., Prudential Insurance Company of America, the Toronto Dominion Bank, and the Hospital for Sick Children Foundation.

Art Gallery of Ontario:  He served as trustee of the Art Gallery of Ontario from 1968 to 1974 and director of the foundation from 1986 to 1992.

Hospital for Sick Children, Toronto:  He held various positions for over thirty four years as trustee of the hospital and director and chairman of the foundation.

On October 21, 1998, Richard Thomson was made an Officer of the Order of Canada.

References
 Order of Canada

1933 births
Living people
University of Toronto alumni
Harvard Business School alumni
Canadian bank presidents
Officers of the Order of Canada
Businesspeople from Toronto
Toronto-Dominion Bank people